The Main Directorate of Deep-Sea Research (transcribed as Glavnoye upravlenie glubokovodnikh issledovanii or GUGI), is a Russian agency belonging to the Armed Forces of the Russian Federation. It is one of the most secret parts of the navy. Its objective is to operate submarines that are able to dive deep into the sea, in order to gather intelligence or to work with installations on the seabed including sabotage. Its original target was the Western surveillance systems of submarines from the Soviet Union and it is able to eavesdrop and sever the fiber optic cables crossing the seas.
It also tests emergency equipment and does medical research on the physiology of diving.

The year of creation of the directorate is uncertain. 1963 (as military unit 90802), 1965, and 1976 have been mentioned.

The directorate is directly subordinate to the Ministry of Defense. It is located separated from the normal navy bases, with its headquarters in Saint Petersburg and a naval base in Olenya Bay on the Kola Peninsula.

Ship
GUGI has submarines that can reach depths of 6000 meters. They are equipped with tools, cameras and lighting in order to carry out operations there. It has more than 50 ships, submarines and floating dry docks, which hide submarines from satellites.

Evgeny Gorigledzhan
Yantar, which can carry and repair several minisubmarines
Belgorod (submarine)
 
Losharik, a 70-meter long atomic submarine that reaches 2000 meters and can be carried by Orenburg 
Khaborovsk (submarine)

References

Russian_intelligence_agencies
Naval units and formations of Russia